Czerwiński (feminine Czerwińska) is a Polish surname. Notable people with the surname include:

Alan Czerwiński (born 1993), Polish footballer
Andrzej Czerwiński (born 1954) is a Polish politician
Anna Czerwińska (born 1949), Polish mountaineer
Eugeniusz Czerwiński (1887–1930), Polish architect
George Czerwinski, member of the Wisconsin State Assembly and the Wisconsin State Senate
Jakub Czerwiński, Polish footballer
Joseph Czerwinski (1944–1998), American legislator
Krzysztof Czerwiński (born 1980), Polish conductor, organist and voice teacher
Mary Czerwinski, American cognitive scientist and computer-human interaction
Paweł Czerwiński (born 1965), Polish diplomat
Pete Czerwinski (born Piotr Czerwinski; 1985), Canadian competitive eater and YouTube personality
Przemysław Czerwiński (born 1983), Polish pole vaulter
Ryszard Czerwiński (born 1954), Polish boxer
Tadeusz Czerwiński (born 1964), Polish sports shooter
Zbigniew Czerwiński (speedway rider), (born 1982), Polish motorcycle speedway rider
Zofia Czerwińska (1933–2019), Polish actress

See also 
Czerwiński and Jaworski CWJ, basic training glider
Czerwiński CW I, Polish glider
Czerwiński CW II, Polish open frame glider
Czerwiński CW IV, Polish high performance glider
Czerwiński-Shenstone Harbinger, Canadian sailplane
Czerwinski-Shenstone UTG-1 Loudon, Canadian sailplane
Czerwiński Sparrow, sometimes known as the de Havilland Canada glider
Sergiuz Czerwiński glider, simple, open frame, monoplane glider 
Wólka Czerwińska, is a village in east-central Poland

Polish-language surnames